Christ Carrying the Cross is a 1597–1600 painting by El Greco, belonging to the end of his life in Toledo. It is now in the Museo del Prado in Madrid.

Bibliography (in Spanish)
 ÁLVAREZ LOPERA, José, El Greco, Madrid, Arlanza, 2005, Biblioteca «Descubrir el Arte», (colección «Grandes maestros»). .
 SCHOLZ-HÄNSEL, Michael, El Greco, Colonia, Taschen, 2003. .
 ArteHistoria.com. «Cristo abrazado a la cruz» [Consulta: 02.02.2011].

References

Paintings by El Greco in the Museo del Prado
1590s paintings
1600s paintings
Paintings depicting Christ carrying the cross